The name Lee has been used for seven tropical cyclones worldwide. In the Atlantic, it replaced the name Lenny.

In the Atlantic:
 Tropical Storm Lee (2005), a short-lived, minimal tropical storm
 Tropical Storm Lee (2011), a strong tropical storm that made landfall in Louisiana, and its remnants caused catastrophic flooding in the Northeast US
 Hurricane Lee (2017), a category 3 hurricane that spent its initial stages as a weak tropical storm

In the Western Pacific:
 Typhoon Lee (1981) (T8129, 29W, Dinang), a category 2 storm that caused 188 fatalities in the Philippines
 Tropical Storm Lee (1985) (T8509, 09W, Huling), struck North Korea
 Tropical Storm Lee (1988) (T8822, 18W, Ningning)

In the Southern Hemisphere:
 Tropical Cyclone Lee-Ariel (2007)

Atlantic hurricane set index articles
Pacific typhoon set index articles
Australian region cyclone set index articles